Joaquin is a city in northeastern Shelby County, Texas, United States. Founded in 1885, it was named after Joaquin Morris, grandson of the original land owner, Benjamin Franklin Morris. Its population was 734 at the 2020 census. It is located on U.S. Highway 84 (future Interstate 69) and the tracks of the Southern Pacific Railroad.

Geography

Joaquin is located at  (31.965511, –94.048316).

According to the United States Census Bureau, the city has a total area of 2.3 square miles (6.0 km2), of which, 2.3 square miles (6.0 km2) of it are land and 0.43% is covered by water.

Historical development
The site was founded in 1885 for a station for the Houston, East and West Texas Railway. The land was donated by Benjamin Franklin Morris, and the site was named for his grandson Joaquin Lopez . The post office was opened in the following year. The site operated as a shipping point for cotton and lumber, with a lumber mill functioning there. The town was incorporated in 1940, with a population increase with the development of the Toledo Bend Reservoir years later.

Notable people

 Reginald Davis III, former NFL wide receiver for the Atlanta Falcons
 Winston Hill, was born in Joaquin on October 23, 1941
 T. Roland Jackson, former NFL running back for the St. Louis Cardinals, Rice University three-year lettermen, 1962 Arklatex college athlete of the year, 1961 and 1962 All Southwest Conference football team, high-school two-time state champion track team Ruston, Louisiana High, member of the prolific Jackson/Hooper family
  Harlen The Sports Guy, Four time National Association of Broadcaster Marconi Award Finalists; East Texas Coaches Association Hall of Fame, 2018.  Two time Silver Beaver Award Winner, Broadcaster, Big Bass Bonanza Tournament Director, 2005 - Present.
 Orren Ray Whiddon, a lieutenant general in the United States Army, he was the commanding general of the 8th Infantry Division from 1985 to 1987, and commanding general of the Second United States Army from 1987 to 1990

Demographics

As of the 2020 United States census, there were 734 people, 320 households, and 238 families residing in the city.

As of the census of 2000,  925 people, 349 households, and 244 families resided in the city. The population density was 401.6 people per square mile (155.3/km2). The 400 housing units averaged 173.7/sq mi (67.1/km2). The racial makeup of the city was 77.84% White, 19.03% African American, 0.86% Native American, 1.08% from other races, and 1.19% from two or more races. Hispanics or Latinos of any race were 3.14% of the population.

Of the 349 households, 33.2% had children under the age of 18 living with them, 50.4% were married couples living together, 16.0% had a female householder with no husband present, and 29.8% were not families. About 27.2% of all households were made up of individuals, and 14.9% had someone living alone who was 65 years of age or older. The average household size was 2.65 and the average family size was 3.26.

In the city, the population was distributed as 29.1% under the age of 18, 8.1% from 18 to 24, 27.8% from 25 to 44, 21.4% from 45 to 64, and 13.6% who were 65 years of age or older. The median age was 34 years. For every 100 females, there were 89.5 males. For every 100 females age 18 and over, there were 85.3 males.

Males had a median income of $25,938 versus $17,000 for females. The per capita income for the city was $12,232. About 19.1% of families and 25.5% of the population were below the poverty line, including 26.6% of those under age 18 and 34.8% of those age 65 or over.

Education
Public education in the city of Joaquin is provided by the Joaquin Independent School District.

Media
The Light and Champion, a news and information company, marked its 140th year of operation in 2017. It serves Shelby County, as well as Logansport, Louisiana.

References

External links
 
 Shelby County Sports

Cities in Texas
Cities in Shelby County, Texas